The University of Nebraska at Kearney (UNK) is a campus of the public University of Nebraska system and located in Kearney, Nebraska. It was founded in 1905 as the Nebraska State Normal School at Kearney.

History
In March 1903 the Nebraska State Legislature appropriated $50,000 to build a normal school in western Nebraska. On October 18, 1904, the cornerstone of the first building was laid, while in the summer of 1905 the school offered its first classes in Kearney public facilities. The first classes on campus were held in the fall of 1905 as building was being completed. The first-year class consisted exclusively of women; Men's Hall was later established as the first hall for male students. The major sidewalks on campus were once roads, and the stoplight was located where the water fountain is now. The first president was Augustus O. Thomas.

In 1921 the institution's name changed to Nebraska State Teachers College. In 1963, it became Kearney State College. Both name changes were a part of system-wide changes for the state colleges.

In 1989, a legislative act transferred the institution from the Nebraska State College System to the University of Nebraska system. After a Nebraska Supreme Court review, Kearney State College became the University of Nebraska at Kearney on July 1, 1991. Before its affiliation with the University of Nebraska, Kearney State had often been called "K State", an expression also often used for Kansas State University.

State Representative Charles J. Warner of Waverly introduced the 1903 bill creating the institution; his son, State Senator Jerome Warner, introduced the bill making UNK a part of the university.

Campus
Not all buildings are part of the contiguous campus, and many are used for non-academic purposes.

Residence halls
Antelope Hall Several nominators and the committee suggested that this name honors the Great Plains heritage, which has distinctively shaped the institution. It also aligns with the positive campus identity and tradition. Antelope Hall houses 160 students, in a mix of two- and four-person suites. Within the complex are computer labs, study rooms, TV lounges, full kitchens and centralized front desks.

Nester Hall is named in honor of former UNK Chancellor William R. Nester who, as President of Kearney State College, led its transition into the University of Nebraska. The William R. Nester and Antelope Halls Complex consists of two housing units along 9th Avenue that are joined by a walk-through bridge way, that is also a lounge, study area and meeting room. Dr. Nester's name was suggested by many nominators and won wide support from those who commented and from the committee. Nester Hall opened in the fall of 2008.

Centennial Towers West (CTW) and Centennial Towers East (CTE) were named in honor of the centennial of Nebraska statehood. Each building is seven stories tall, tying them for the tallest buildings in Kearney, and between them they house approximately 750 students. CTW underwent renovation during the 2012–2013 academic year and CTW was updated in 2013–2014.

Jennie M. Conrad Hall was demolished in the summer of 2021.

Lyle E. Mantor Hall houses approximately 320 students with a number of lounge areas, each equipped with pool tables, televisions, and computer facilities.  Mantor Hall is home to the Thompson Learning Community.

George E. Martin Hall is currently (as of 2021) undergoing renovations as part of a new Fraternity and Sorority Life housing complex expected to be completed in August 2022.

Men's Hall was built as a WPA project in the late Depression, and its distinctive Art-Deco design has netted it a place on the National Register of Historic Places. At various times it has contained faculty offices, the campus library, and a cafeteria, but it has been returned to its original use as a residence hall. Despite the name, residence is co-educational. After renovations in 2010, the hall now houses only students in the Honors Program.

Everett L. Randall Hall is adjacent to Mantor Hall and is conveniently located near the center of campus.  Renovated in 2011, Randall has a ground level lounge with a game room, laundry facilities and computer lab

H.G. Stout Hall was demolished in early 2011.

University Heights was an off-campus apartment complex of one-bedroom and studio apartments. Often referred to as "U-Heights," this facility comprised three buildings about a mile from campus. Space in University Heights was reserved for upperclass students, married students, non-traditional-aged students, and students with children. University Heights was closed in May 2017 and sold to Henning Brothers LLC for $800,004. The facility has been renovated and is currently a privately owned apartment complex.

University Residence North and University Residence South, known respectively as "URN" and "URS," are homes to the university fraternity and sorority chapters. These buildings house about 400 students between them and have on-site dining facilities.

University Village Flats, apartment complex of one-bedroom and two bedroom apartments. Completed in the summer of 2018 and first occupied by students during the 2018/2019 school year. Located south of West Center and Highway 30 on West Campus.

Classroom buildings
The William E. Bruner Hall of Science is home to the departments of Physics, Biology, and Chemistry

The College of Education Building is home to the departments of Teacher Education, Educational Administration, Counseling and School Psychology, and Communications Disorders. It is also the site of the office of the Dean of the College of Education.

The Communications Center Building originally part of the Nebraska State Tubercular Hospital, was expanded in 1995 and is now home to eCampus, eCampus Video Services, and University Marketing.

Copeland Hall, formerly the campus gymnasium, was refitted in 1961 and is now the seat of the departments of History, Psychology, and Sociology, Geography and Earth Sciences, Criminal Justice, Political Science as well as the Dean of Natural & Social Sciences.

Discovery Hall, located on UNK's west campus, is a 90,000-square-foot academic building that houses the construction management, industrial distribution, interior and product design, aviation, cyber systems, mathematics and statistics, physics, astronomy and engineering programs. The building opened in August 2020 as part of a $30 million project replacing the Otto C. Olsen industrial arts building.

The Fine Arts Building, locally known as "The FAB", is home to the department of Music and the Performing Arts, which includes programs in music, theatre, and dance. The building contains a music recital hall, a proscenium theater, and a black box theater. A wing added to this building houses the department of Art and Design. There is also a coffee shop in the middle of the building.

Jerome and Charles J. Warner Hall (formerly known as Founders Hall) is a multi-purpose building and one of the most visible structures on campus. It is home to classrooms and offices for the Social Work department. It also houses administrative offices for the Institutional Research, General Studies, Assessment, Residence Life, Honors Program, and Graduate Studies programs, and numerous university administration offices, including the Chancellor and Vice Chancellor Offices, Finance, Registrar, Human Resources, Business Services, Budget and AA/EEO.

The Health and Sports Center houses indoor spectator sports for UNK, including locker facilities, equipment rooms, athletic weight area, athletic training facilities, wrestling and martial arts rooms and concession and rest room facilities for the benefit of spectators utilizing the 6000-seat arena. It is also the site of graduation ceremonies.

The Ockinga Seminar Center provides two large seminar rooms used by classes and campus events, as well as office space for International Education.

Otto Olsen is another multi-purpose building, near the center of campus. It was formerly home to Information Technology Services, International Education, Study Abroad, English Language Institute, in addition to classrooms and offices for the departments of Computer Science & Information Technology and Industrial Technology.

The Ron & Carol Cope Center for Safety Education and Research includes a driving range and provides space for services offered by the Nebraska Safety Center.

A.O. Thomas Hall was a campus elementary school from 1926 to 1963, providing an opportunity for Education students to practice teaching in a campus environment. It now houses the departments of English, Modern Languages, and Philosophy.

Roland B Welch Hall was another part of the Nebraska State Tubercular Hospital. Welch Hall was demolished during the spring semester of 2019 to make room for the new STEM building.

West Center was the main building for the old Nebraska State Tubercular Hospital. It now houses the departments of Accounting/Finance, Management, Marketing, Economics, Family Studies & Interior Design, the Safety Center, the Center for Entrepreneurship & Rural Development, the Center for Economic Education, and Army ROTC program.

The Health Science Education Complex is a partnership between the UNMC College of Nursing, UNMC School of Allied Health Professions and the University of Nebraska at Kearney to expand and deliver health profession education at UNK. The building is home to 7 academic programs: nursing and graduate nursing, physician assistants, physical therapy, clinical laboratory science, radiography, diagnostic medical sonography (allied health professions). The Health Science Education Complex opened in August 2015.

Other facilities
The Nebraskan Student Union contains the dining hall, campus bookstore, several fast-food counters and snack shops, rooms for music, TV and study, pool tables, a ballroom used for University activities, and the Office of Diversity & Inclusion.

The Calvin T. Ryan Library contains the library and some of the campus computer facilities, and is attached to the Mitchell Communications Center. The Mitchell Communications Center holds the Communications Department, television and radio broadcast facilities, and the office of the student-run Antelope Newspaper.

The Health and Sports Center is a 6,000 seat multi-purpose arena that is the home of the indoor spectator sports teams (including basketball and volleyball). It was built in 1990. There are also offices for teams and staff, locker facilities, weight, training, wrestling, and martial arts rooms.

Cushing Coliseum, connected to the Health and Sports Center, is the arena for indoor intercollegiate athletics. The building also contains classroom facilities which are used by the Kinesiology and Sport Sciences programs.

The Wellness Center is modern 19,000-square-foot facility east of Cushing Coliseum. The center opened August 1, 2014, to students and includes program and research space, in addition to a large fitness center and rock climbing wall. The space is also used for community-based programming.

The Facilities Building houses the UNK Police Department, and maintenance shop for the university.

The General Services Building was originally built as the Military Science building in 1969. Since the ROTC left campus in 1995, this building has housed some of the physical plant operations.

The Memorial Student Affairs Building houses Admissions, Honors, Campus Post Office, Career Services, Counseling and Health Care, Student Support Services, Financial Aid, and Academic Advising Center.

The Museum of Nebraska Art, founded by the state legislature and located in Kearney since 1986, is administered as a department of the university.

The G.W. Frank Museum of History and Culture is a Richardsonian Romanesque mansion on the western edge of campus, formerly the residence of the administrator of the Nebraska State Tubercular Hospital. Now listed on the National Register of Historic Places, G.W. Frank Museum of History and Culture is open to the public, as well as being used for University functions.

eCampus

UNK has an eCampus offering online undergraduate and graduate degree programs as well as a blended-learning (online and face-to-face) Driver Education endorsement program.  UNK was ranked 9th best Public Regional University in the Midwest by U.S. News & World Report, and the eCampus was ranked 35th overall among online graduate education programs in the United States in US News' 2017 Online College Rankings.

Greek life

Sororities
 Alpha Omicron Pi
 Alpha Phi
 Alpha Xi Delta 
 Gamma Phi Beta
 Lambda Theta Nu
 Sigma Lambda Gamma
 Mu Sigma Upsilon

Fraternities
 Phi Gamma Delta
 Phi Delta Theta
 Pi Kappa Alpha
 Sigma Lambda Beta
 Sigma Phi Epsilon
 Sigma Tau Gamma
 Delta Tau Delta

Athletics

The Nebraska–Kearney (UNK) athletic teams are called the Lopers. The university is a member of the Division II level of the National Collegiate Athletic Association (NCAA), primarily competing in the Mid-America Intercollegiate Athletics Association (MIAA) for most of its sports since the 2012–13 academic year; while its women's swimming and diving team competes in the Northern Sun Intercollegiate Conference (NSIC). The Lopers previously competed in the D-II Rocky Mountain Athletic Conference (RMAC) from 1994–95 to 2011–12 (which they were a member on a previous stint as a provisional member during the 1989–90 school year); and in the Central States Intercollegiate Conference (CSIC) of the National Association of Intercollegiate Athletics (NAIA) from 1976–77 to 1988–89.

UNK competes in 17 intercollegiate varsity sports: Men's sports include basketball, cross country, football, tennis, track & field (indoor and outdoor) and wrestling; basketball, cross country, golf, soccer, softball, swimming & diving, tennis, track & field (indoor and outdoor) and volleyball.

Notable alumni
Jon Bokenkamp – American writer and producer best known for his role in writing the screenplay for Taking Lives, The Call, and creating the NBC series The Blacklist along with The Blacklist: Redemption.
Emily Balcetis – associate professor of psychology at New York University
Joba Chamberlain – New York Yankees pitcher
Richard Davenport – president of Minnesota State University, Mankato
Tervel Dlagnev – Olympic wrestler
Gary Dop – poet
Marg Helgenberger – actress "Catherine Willows" CSI
Arthur Hobbs – defensive back for the Hamilton Tiger-Cats
Tom Kropp – NBA player (Washington Bullets, Chicago Bulls), father of UNK alumni Dominique Kropp
Bart Kofoed – NBA basketball player
Richard G. Kopf – judge, U.S. District Court for the District of Nebraska
Stephen Lawhead – noted author of several fantasy and science-fiction novels
Ira J. McDonald – Los Angeles City Council member, 1941–45
Harry Northup – actor Taxi Driver and The Silence of the Lambs, and poet, Red Snow Fence
Larry L. Peterson – computer scientist
Mahabir Pun – Ramon Magsaysay Award winning Nepalese philanthropist
Randy Rasmussen – former New York Jets player
Tim Schlattmann – co-executive producer of Dexter (TV series)
Tauese Sunia – former governor of American Samoa
Kamaru Usman – NCAA DII Wrestling champion, professional mixed martial artist, former UFC Welterweight Champion
Raufeon Stots, two-time NCAA Division II Wrestling champion, current Bellator mixed martial artist
Don Welch – poet

Notable faculty
Allison Hedge Coke The Distinguished Paul W. Reynolds and Clarice Kingston Reynolds Endowed Chair in English. 2007– 2011. American Book Award Poet-Writer.
Don Welch The Distinguished Paul W. Reynolds and Clarice Kingston Reynolds Endowed Chair in English. 1987–1997. Poet. Distinguished Martin Chair. Retired. Reynolds Professor Emeritus.

References

External links
 
 Nebraska–Kearney Athletics website
 

 
University of Nebraska at Kearney
Educational institutions established in 1905
Buildings and structures in Kearney, Nebraska
Education in Buffalo County, Nebraska
Tourist attractions in Buffalo County, Nebraska
1905 establishments in Nebraska
Kearney